Dominik Kun (born 22 June 1993) is a Polish professional footballer who plays as a winger for Widzew Łódź.

Club career
On 14 August 2020, he signed a two-year contract with Widzew Łódź.

References

External links
 
 

1993 births
People from Giżycko
Sportspeople from Warmian-Masurian Voivodeship
Living people
Polish footballers
Poland youth international footballers
Poland under-21 international footballers
Association football midfielders
OKS Stomil Olsztyn players
Pogoń Szczecin players
Wisła Płock players
MKP Pogoń Siedlce players
Sandecja Nowy Sącz players
Widzew Łódź players
Ekstraklasa players
I liga players